The genus Paradisaea consists of six species of birds-of-paradise (family Paradisaeidae). The genus is found on the island of New Guinea as well as the nearby islands groups of the Aru Islands, D'Entrecasteaux Islands and Raja Ampat Islands. The species inhabit a range of forest types from sea level to mid-montane forests. Several species have highly restricted distributions, and all species have disjunct distributions. A 2009 study examining the mitochondrial DNA of the family found that the Paradisaea birds-of-paradise were in a clade with the genus Cicinnurus. It showed that the blue bird-of-paradise was a sister taxon to all the other species in this genus.

All are large, and sexually dimorphic. The plumage of the males includes characteristic grossly elongated flank plumes (which emerge from beneath the wings and strictly speaking are flank plumes pectoral plumes), and a pair of wire-like feathers emerging from the end of the tail. The flank plumes are used during breeding displays.

The name, Paradisaea, is the Latinized form of "paradise". The local name in Indonesia is cenderawasih.

Taxonomy
The genus Paradisaea was introduced by the Swedish naturalist Carl Linnaeus in 1758 in the tenth edition of his Systema Naturae. The genus name is from Late Latin paradisus meaning "paradise". The type species was designated as the greater bird-of-paradise (Paradisaea apoda) by George Robert Gray in 1840.

Species
The genus contains six species.

Notes

References

 
Bird genera